The Bix 7 Road Race is held annually in Davenport, Iowa, as a commemoration to Davenport native and jazz musician Bix Beiderbecke. It is followed a week later by the Bix Beiderbecke Memorial Jazz Festival.

Race
The 7 mile road race is annually held during late July, in the streets of downtown Davenport, Iowa. The race was founded in 1975 by John Hudetz, a resident of Bettendorf, Iowa. After competing in the 1974 Boston Marathon, Hudetz was inspired to bring the excitement to the Quad-Cities with a race of his own. The inaugural race had a field consisting of eighty-four runners. Today the race is often run by 12,000 to 18,000 runners.

The United States’ boycott of the 1980 Olympics helped gain the Bix 7 exposure. Bill Rodgers, the world's top distance runner at the time, was unable to compete in Moscow, so he went to Davenport instead. The leadership of Race Director Ed Froehlich, promotion by the Quad-City Times newspaper, and generosity from several corporate sponsorships, has helped the Bix 7 develop into the largest non-marathon race in the Midwest, The race consistently draws elite talent from all over the globe. Running legends Bill Rodgers and 1984 Olympic Marathon Gold Medalist Joan Benoit Samuelson also compete yearly.

The run is primarily sponsored by the Quad City Times and is a separate entity from the Bix Beiderbecke Memorial Society and the Bix Beiderbecke Memorial Jazz Festival, which is held the following weekend. The race has several other sponsors, at the Platinum, Gold Medal, and contributing level respectively.

The race went virtual in 2020.

Champions

Notes

External links
Quad-City Times Bix 7
Facebook Page
7 starting line 2010 YouTube By: Scott C. Holgorsen : Videographer Quad-Cities USA 

Tourist attractions in Davenport, Iowa
Festivals in Iowa
Long-distance running competitions
Sports in the Quad Cities
Culture of the Quad Cities
Road running competitions in the United States